Larissa is the capital and largest city of Thessaly, Greece

Larissa or Larisa may also refer to:

Places 
Larissa (regional unit), an administrative division of Greece, centered on the city of Larissa

Ancient Greek settlements 
Larissa Cremaste, an ancient Greek city in Achaea Phthiotis, in the south east of Thessaly
Larissa (Argos), the acropolis of the Greek city of Argos in the Peloponnese, Greece
Larisa (Caria), an ancient Greek town in Caria, Anatolia, now in Turkey
Larissa (Elis), an ancient Greek city in Elis, Peloponnese
Larisa (Ionia), an ancient Greek town in Ionia, Anatolia, now in Turkey
Larisa (Lydia), an ancient Greek town in Lydia, Anatolia, now in Turkey
Larissa (Thrace), an ancient Greek city in the region between the rivers Nestos and Hebros
Larisa (Troad), an ancient Greek city in Troad, northwestern Turkey. A Larissa mentioned in Homer's Iliad was likely this city, but some 19th century scholars erroneously placed it in Thrace
Larissa Phrikonis, an ancient Greek city in Aeolis, western Turkey
 Larissa, an ancient Greek city in Syria settled by colonists from the Thessalian city of the same name, now known as Shaizar
 Larissa, ancient name of Gortyn

Others 
 possibly an ancient name of Sveti Vlas, Bulgaria
Larissa, Missouri, a ghost town in the United States
Larissa, Texas, a community in the United States

Given name
 Larissa (name), a female first name, including a list of people named Larissa or Larisa
 Larissa (mythology), a nymph from Greek mythology

Astronomy
 Larissa (moon), a moon of Neptune
 1162 Larissa, an asteroid

Other uses
 Larisa (genus), a genus of moths
 Larisa, a 1980 short film directed by Elem Klimov

See also 
 Philo of Larissa, a Greek philosopher